The Huangshi Yangtze River Bridge is a box girder bridge across the Yangtze River in Huangshi, Hubei Province in central China. The bridge is made of prestressed concrete. The bridge was built from 1991 and 1995. In 2002, defects in the structure were discovered, prompting the need for renovation.

See also
Yangtze River bridges and tunnels
List of largest cable-stayed bridges
List of tallest bridges in the world

References 

Bridges over the Yangtze River
Bridges completed in 1995
Huangshi
Bridges in Hubei
1995 establishments in China